Rubén Primo Iznardo (born 12 April 1990) is a Spanish footballer who plays for Águilas FC as a defender.

Club career
Born in Valencia, Primo started playing as a senior with CD Dénia in the third division and, after two seasons with the club, signed with UD Almería, being initially assigned to the B-team also in that category. On 6 September 2011, he was called up to train with the main squad.

On 12 October 2011 Primo made his official debut with Almería's first team, starting in a 1–0 home win against Elche CF for the season's Copa del Rey and being sent off in the match. He would resume his spell with the B-side, featuring regularly.

On 16 August 2013 the free agent Primo signed with CF Cullera, in Tercera División. On 21 July of the following year he moved abroad, joining Italian Serie D side Terracina Calcio 1925.

References

External links
 Almería official profile 
 
 

1990 births
Living people
Footballers from Valencia (city)
Spanish footballers
Association football defenders
Segunda División B players
Tercera División players
UD Almería B players
UD Almería players
Spanish expatriate footballers
Spanish expatriate sportspeople in Italy
Expatriate footballers in Italy
Águilas FC players